The Gourdou-Leseurre GL.50, also known as the Gourdou-Leseurre Type F, was a French fighter prototype of the early 1920s.

Development
In April 1919, General Duval of the French Armée de l'Air set out for the replacement of two of the principal categories of aircraft within the air force - CAP2 (Chasse, Armée, Biplace meaning 'armed two-seat fighter') and CAN2 (Chasse, Armée, Nuit, Biplace meaning 'armed two-seat night fighter'). Gourdou-Leseurre put forward the GL-50 as a submission for the CAP2 category (despite the fact that this categorisation system was removed in 1920). Its 300 hp Hispano-Suiza engine was intended to be fitted with a supercharger, however this was not fitted, despite the fact it would have increased its performance drastically. It was of wooden construction, with a long-span untapered wing, considered unusual at the time, that feature being more in line with single-seat aircraft design, as were the wing bracing struts.

Operational history
The date is not recorded of the first flight of the GL-50, however it is known that it occurred in 1922. However, for no apparent reason the aircraft did not satisfy the needs of the specification and therefore no further production was continued. Only 1 GL.50 was built, and also one of its main variant, the GL.51.

Variants
 GL.51 - intended to satisfy the CAN2 specification. Similar to the GL-50 except for a 380 hp Gnome & Rhône 9Ab engine and a lighter loaded weight resulting in a higher top speed

Specifications (GL.50)

References

 

1920s French fighter aircraft
Gourdou-Leseurre aircraft